Noise Floor may refer to:

 Noise floor, a term in signal measurement
 Noise Floor (Rarities: 1998–2005), an album by Bright Eyes
 Noise Floor (Spock's Beard album)